Fred Charles may refer to:

 Fred Charles (Manitoba politician)
 Fred Charles (footballer), English footballer